The Tonight Show Starring Johnny Carson is an American late-night talk show hosted by Johnny Carson on NBC, the third iteration of the Tonight Show franchise. The show debuted on October 1, 1962, and aired its final episode on May 22, 1992. Ed McMahon served as Carson's sidekick and the show's announcer.

For its first decade, Johnny Carson's The Tonight Show was based at 30 Rockefeller Plaza, New York City, with some episodes recorded at NBC Studios in Burbank, California; on May 1, 1972, the show moved to Burbank as its main venue and remained there exclusively after May 1972 until Carson's retirement. The show's house band, the NBC Orchestra, was led by Skitch Henderson, until 1966 when Milton Delugg took over, who was succeeded by Doc Severinsen less than a year later.

The series has been ranked as one of the greatest TV shows of all time in polls from both 2002 and 2013.

Format 
Johnny Carson's Tonight Show established the modern format of the late-night talk show: a monologue sprinkled with a rapid-fire series of 16 to 22 one-liners (Carson had a rule of no more than three on the same subject) was followed by sketch comedy, then moving on to guest interviews and performances by musicians and stand-up comedians. Occasionally, Carson interviewed prominent politicians such as Richard Nixon, Ronald Reagan, Bill Clinton, Robert F. Kennedy, and Hubert Humphrey, however Carson refused to discuss his personal political views on the show out of concern it might alienate his audience. Other regulars were selected for their entertainment or information value, in contrast to those who offered more cerebral conversation.

His preference for access to Hollywood stars caused the show's move to the West Coast on May 1, 1972; The Tonight Show would not return to New York until 2014 when Jimmy Fallon took the hosting reins. When asked about intellectual conversation on The Tonight Show, Carson and his staff invariably cited "Carl Sagan, Paul Ehrlich, Margaret Mead, Gore Vidal, Shana Alexander, Madalyn Murray O'Hair" as guests; one television critic stated, however, "he always presented them as if they were spinach for your diet when he did [feature such names]." Family therapist Carlfred Broderick appeared on the show ten times, and psychologist Joyce Brothers was one of Carson's most frequent guests. Carson, in general, did not feature prop comedy acts (Carson was not averse to using prop comedy himself); such acts, with Gallagher being a prominent example, more commonly appeared when guest hosts helmed the program.

Carson almost never socialized with guests before or after the show; frequent interviewee Orson Welles recalled that Tonight Show employees were astonished when Carson visited Welles's dressing room to say hello before a show. Unlike his avuncular counterparts Merv Griffin, Mike Douglas, and Dick Cavett, Carson was a comparatively "cool" host who only laughed when genuinely amused and abruptly cut short monotonous or embarrassingly inept interviewees. Mort Sahl recalled, "The producer crouches just off camera and holds up a card that says, 'Go to commercial.' So Carson goes to a commercial and the whole team rushes up to his desk to discuss what had gone wrong, like a pit stop at Le Mans." Actor Robert Blake once compared being interviewed by Carson to "facing the death squad" or "Broadway on opening night." The publicity value of appearing on The Tonight Show was so great, however, that most guests were willing to subject themselves to the risk.

Show regulars

Ed McMahon 
The series' announcer and Carson's sidekick was Ed McMahon, who from the first show would introduce Carson with a drawn-out "Here's Johnny!" (something McMahon was inspired to do by the overemphasized way he had introduced reporter Robert Pierpoint on the NBC Radio Network program Monitor). The catchphrase was heard nightly for 30 years, and ranked top of the TV Land poll of U.S. TV catchphrases and quotes in 2006; it has been referenced in all media going from The Shining to Johnny Bravo to a "Weird Al" Yankovic album cut; it was even used for the character Johnny Cage in the video game series Mortal Kombat.

McMahon, who held the same role in Carson's ABC game show Who Do You Trust? for five years previously, would remain standing to the side as Carson did his monologue, laughing (sometimes obsequiously) at his jokes, then join him at the guest chair when Carson moved to his desk. The two would usually interact in a comic spot for a short while before the first guest was introduced.

McMahon stated in a 1978 profile of Carson in The New Yorker that "the 'Tonight Show' is my staple diet, my meat and potatoes—I'm realistic enough to know that everything else stems from that." After a 1965 incident in which he ruined Carson's joke on the air McMahon was careful to, as he said, "never to go where [Carson]'s going." He wrote in his 1998 autobiography:

Bandleaders and others 

The Tonight Show had a live big band for nearly all of its existence. The NBC Orchestra during Carson's reign was originally led by Skitch Henderson (who had previously led the band during Tonight Starring Steve Allen), followed briefly by Milton DeLugg. Starting in 1967 and continuing until Jay Leno took over, the band was led by Doc Severinsen, with Tommy Newsom filling in for him when he was absent or filling in for McMahon as the announcer (this usually happened when a guest host substituted for Carson, which generally gave McMahon the night off as well). The series' instrumental theme music, "Johnny's Theme," was a re-arrangement of the Paul Anka composition "Toot Sweet," which Anka and Annette Funicello had separately recorded, with lyrics, as "It's Really Love." During shows when Newsom filled in for Severinsen, the band played a slightly truncated version of the theme that transitioned from the bridge to the closing phrase without reprising the first few notes of the main melody. The NBC Orchestra was the last in-house studio orchestra to perform on American television.

Behind the scenes, motion picture director/producer Fred de Cordova joined The Tonight Show in 1970 as producer, graduating to executive producer in 1984. Unlike many people of his position, de Cordova often appeared on the show, bantering with Carson from his chair off-camera (though occasionally a camera would be pointed in his direction).

Recurring segments and skits

Characters 

 Carnac the Magnificent, in which Carson played a psychic who clairvoyantly divined the answer to a question contained in a sealed envelope. This was to some degree a variation on Steve Allen's recurring "The Question Man" sketch. The answer was always an outrageous pun. "Carnac" examples:
"Debate" ... "What do you use to catch de fish?"
"Baja"   ... "What sound does a sheep make when it laughs?"
"Ben-Gay" ... "Why didn't Mrs. Franklin have any kids?"
"A loaf of bread, a jug of wine, and thou" ... "Name three things that have yeast."
"Three Dog Night" ... "What's a bad night for a tree?"
"Mount Baldy" ... "What did Yul Brynner's wife do on their wedding night?" also "How do you play 'horsey' with Don Rickles?"

"Sis boom bah" ... "Describe the sound made when a sheep explodes." (Ed McMahon's personal favorite)
If the laughter fell short when a line bombed (as it often did), "Carnac" would face the audience with mock seriousness and bestow a comic curse: "May a diseased yak befriend your sister!" or "May a rabid holy man bless your nether regions with a power tool!"

 "Floyd R. Turbo," a dimwitted yokel responding to a TV station editorial. Floyd always spoke haltingly, as though reading from cue cards, and railed against some newsworthy topic, like Secretaries' Day: "This raises the question: Kiss my Dictaphone!"
 "Art Fern," the fast-talking host of a "Tea Time Movie" program, who advertised inane products, assisted by the attractive Matinee Lady, played by Paula Prentiss (late 1960s), Carol Wayne (the most familiar Matinee Lady, 1971–81, 1984), Danuta Wesley (1982), and Teresa Ganzel (1984–92). He imitated the vocal stylings of Jackie Gleason’s character “Reginald Van Gleason”. The fake movies Art would introduce usually had eclectic casts ("Ben Blue, Red Buttons, Jesse White, and Karen Black") and nonsensical titles ("Rin-Tin-Tin Gets Fixed Fixed Fixed"). This would be followed by a four-second stock film clip before coming back for another commercial, usually catching Art and the Matinee Lady in a very compromising position. On giving directions to a fake store he was touting, Fern would show a spaghetti-like road map, sometimes with a literal "fork in the road," other times making the joke, "Go to the Slauson Cutoff...," and the audience would recite with him, "...cut off your Slauson!" The character was previously named "Honest Bernie Schlock" and then "Ralph Willie" when the Tea Time sketches first aired in the mid-to-late 1960s. At least one surviving pre-1972 Art Fern sketch that originated from New York had its movie show title as "The Big Flick," an amalgam of two movie show titles in use at the time by New York station WOR-TV, The Big Preview and The Flick. On that sketch Lee Meredith was the Matinee Lady. Carson's Comedy Classics features an episode where Juliet Prowse is in the role of Matinee Lady, from 20 August 1971.
 "Aunt Blabby," an old woman whose appearance and speech pattern bore more than a passing resemblance to comedian Jonathan Winters' character "Maude Frickert." A frequent theme would be McMahon happening to mention a word or phrase that could suggest death, as in "What tourist attractions did you check out?," to which Aunt Blabby would respond, "Never say check out to an old person!"
 "El Mouldo," mysterious mentalist. He would announce some mind-over-matter feat and always fail, although triumphantly shouting "El Mouldo has done it again!" Ed McMahon would take exception, noting El Mouldo's failure. "Did I fail before?" asked El Mouldo. "Yes!," replied McMahon, to which El Mouldo said, "Well, I've done it again!" El Mouldo was in large part a continuation of Carson's mentalist character Dillinger, which he had performed on The Johnny Carson Show in 1955 on CBS-TV; Dillinger was an obvious spoof of Dunninger, leading to complaints and threats of lawsuits against Carson and CBS.
 "David Howitzer, Consumer Supporter," a thinly veiled satire of consumer reporter David Horowitz. Howitzer's segments (in a rare example of prop comedy for the show) usually featured purported counterfeit consumer goods (usually gag props) that unscrupulous mail-order companies had sent his unsuspecting viewers (for example, a woman who spent thousands of dollars on an oriental rug instead received a cheap toupee made in Taiwan).
 "Ronald Reagan." During President Reagan's term in office, Carson developed an impersonation of the president that was featured regularly in a Mighty Carson Art Players segment. Carson also did a less memorable impersonation of Jimmy Carter during his term as President.

Bits 
 "Stump the Band," where studio audience members ask the band to try to play obscure songs given only the title. Unlike when this routine was done during the Jack Paar years with the Jose Melis band, Severinsen's band almost never knew the song, but that did not stop them from inventing one on the spot. Example:
Guest's request: "My Dead Dog Rover"
Doc Severinsen, singing: "My dead dog Rover / lay under the sun / and stayed there all summer / until he was done!"
David Letterman revived this bit later, along with the CBS Orchestra on his Late Show.
 "The Mighty Carson Art Players," (depending on one's point of view, the name was an obvious tribute to or ripoff of radio legend Fred Allen's Mighty Allen Art Players). While Carson's show was primarily a talk show, with performances by guests, periodically Carson and a group of stock performers would perform skits that spoofed news, movies, television shows, commercials, and past events. A Mighty Carson Art Players appearance would usually be announced along with that night's guests during McMahon's introduction.
Example: Johnny, dressed as a doctor, starting to talk about some intimate topic (just as in the real ad) and then being hit by cream pies from several directions at once.
 "The Edge of Wetness," in which Johnny would read humorous plot summaries of a fictional soap opera (such as The Edge of Night) while the camera randomly chose an unsuspecting audience member whom Carson claimed was, for example, the butler from the soap.
 "Headlines," developed by Jay Leno, and seen only during nights when he guest-hosted beginning in 1986, featured humorous stories and typos from newspaper clippings. This carried over when Leno became permanent host in 1992.
 "How ___ was it?" a recurring call-and-response during Carson's monologues. Carson would set up the joke with a passing comment about, for instance, the weather with the phrase "It was so hot..." prompting the audience to respond "HOW HOT WAS IT?" Carson would then follow with several punch lines (e.g. "I heard Burger King singing, 'If you want it made your way, cook it yourself!'"). Carson would occasionally throw the audience off with an anti-joke (such as "it was worth the trip in, wasn't it?").

Programming history 

Jack Paar's last appearance was on March 29, 1962, and due to Carson's commitment to the ABC game show Who Do You Trust?, he could not take over until October 1 (the day his ABC contract expired). His first guests were Rudy Vallée, Tony Bennett, Mel Brooks, and Joan Crawford. Carson inherited from Paar a show that was 1 3/4 hours (105 minutes) long. The show broadcast two openings, one starting at 11:15 p.m. and including the monologue, the other that listed the guests and re-announced the host, starting at 11:30 p.m. The two openings gave affiliates the option of screening either a fifteen-minute or thirty-minute local newscast preceding Carson. Since 1959, the show had been videotaped earlier the same broadcast day.

As more affiliates introduced thirty minutes of local news, Carson's monologue was being seen by fewer people. To rectify this situation, Ed McMahon and Skitch Henderson co-hosted the first fifteen minutes of the show between February 1965 and December 1966 without Carson, who then took over at 11:30. Finally, because he wanted the show to start when he came on, at the beginning of January 1967 Carson insisted the 11:15 segment be eliminated (which, he claimed in a monologue at the time, "no one actually watched except the Armed Forces and four Navajos in Gallup, New Mexico").

January 1965 – September 1966: Saturday or Sunday 11:15 p.m.–1:00 a.m. (reruns, initially billed as The Saturday Tonight Show)
September 1966 – September 1975: Saturday or Sunday 11:30 p.m.–1:00 a.m. (reruns, now identified as The Saturday/Sunday Tonight Show; The Weekend Tonight Show by 1973)
January 2, 1967 – September 12, 1980: Monday–Friday 11:30 p.m.–1:00 a.m.

By the mid-1970s Tonight was the most profitable show on television, making NBC $50 to $60 million ($ to $ million in ) each year. Carson influenced the scheduling of reruns (which typically aired under the title The Best of Carson) in the mid-1970s and, in 1980, the length of each evening's broadcast, by threatening NBC with, in the first case, moving to another network, and in the latter, retiring altogether.

In order to work fewer days each week, Carson began to petition network executives in 1974 that reruns on the weekends be discontinued, in favor of showing them on one or more nights during the week. In response to his demands, NBC created a new comedy/variety series to feed to affiliates on Saturday nights that debuted in October 1975, Saturday Night Live.

In 1980, Carson renewed his contract with the stipulation that the show lose its last half-hour. On the last 90-minute show (September 12, 1980), Carson explained that by going to an hour, the show would feel more fast-paced, and have a greater selection of guests.

For a year, Tom Snyder's existing talk show, Tomorrow, was expanded to 90 minutes and forced to change its format, adding gossip reporter Rona Barrett as a co-host and taking on the name Tomorrow Coast to Coast. This was short-lived as a year and a half later, Snyder had quit and Tomorrow Coast to Coast had been canceled. Carson was given authority to fill the vacant time slot and used it to create Late Night with David Letterman (1982–1993). Today, The Tonight Show remains one hour in length and is still followed by Late Night, currently under the title Late Night with Seth Meyers (2014–).

September 15, 1980 – August 30, 1991: Monday–Friday 11:30 p.m.–12:30 a.m.
September 2, 1991 – May 22, 1992: Monday–Friday 11:35 p.m.–12:35 a.m.

In May 1991, following positive viewer reception during tests in St. Louis (KSDK) and Dallas–Fort Worth (KXAS), NBC reached an agreement with Carson Productions to delay the show's start time by five minutes beginning September 2, allowing its stations to include more commercials during their local newscasts. (The timeshift would also affect Late Night, Later with Bob Costas, and station-programmed overnight syndicated shows.) NBC executives had been proposing the five-minute delay idea to Carson since 1988, only to be repeatedly rebuffed, amid concerns that some of its affiliates—particularly those that had unsuccessfully sought permission to delay the Tonight Show by a half-hour—would begin preempting the program entirely and replace it with syndicated reruns to generate extra revenue from local advertising.

In an onscreen eulogy to Carson in 2005, David Letterman said that every talk show host owes his livelihood to Johnny Carson during his Tonight Show run.

1979–1980 contract battle 

In 1979, when Fred Silverman was the head of NBC, Carson took the network to court, claiming that he had been a free agent since April of that year because his most recent contract had been signed in 1972. Carson cited a California law barring certain contracts from lasting more than seven years. NBC claimed that it had signed three agreements since then and Carson was bound to the network until April 1981. While the case was settled out of court, the friction between Carson and the network remained and Carson was actively courted by rival network ABC, which was willing to double Carson's salary and offer him a lighter work schedule and ownership of the show. NBC, in turn, was ready to offer The Tonight Show to Carson's most frequent guest host at the time, Richard Dawson.

Eventually, Carson reached an agreement that paid $25 million a year while reducing his workload from 90 to 60 minutes, with new shows airing only three nights a week 37 weeks a year (a guest host would appear Monday nights and for most of Carson's 15 weeks of vacation and "Best of Carson" reruns would air Tuesdays) and also give him ownership of the show, as well as its back catalog, and of the time slot following the Tonight Show which became Late Night with David Letterman produced by Carson Productions. In September 1980, Carson's eponymous production company gained ownership of the show after owning it from 1969 to the early 1970s.

Archives 

Only 33 complete episodes of Johnny Carson's Tonight Show that had originally aired prior to May 1, 1972 are known to exist. All other shows during this period, including Carson's debut as host, are now considered lost. Carson's shows were preserved by NBC into the early 1970s, but then thrown out to free storage space after the show moved to Burbank, California. When Carson later learned of their destruction, he was furious.

Other surviving material from the era has been found on kinescopes held in the archives of the Armed Forces Radio and Television Service, or in the personal collections of guests of the program, while a few moments such as Tiny Tim's wedding, were preserved. New York meteorologist Dr. Frank Field, an occasional guest during the years he was weather forecaster for WNBC-TV, showed several clips of his appearances with Carson in a 2002 career retrospective on WWOR-TV; Field had maintained the clips in his own personal archives. There are also two appearances by Judy Garland in 1968 that still survive. John Lennon and Paul McCartney's joint appearance on the May 14, 1968 episode guest-hosted by Joe Garagiola, with a guest appearance by Tallulah Bankhead (one of her last), was preserved on poor-quality home kinescope and audiotape in separate recordings by Beatles fans.  Similarly, the Supremes' May 22, 1967 appearance survives on poor-quality kinescope and an audio recording of their April 5, 1968 appearance honoring the recently slain Martin Luther King Jr. was preserved.

The program archive is virtually complete from 1973 to 1992. Carson Productions has also made clips available on YouTube and Antenna TV.

Although no footage is known to remain of Carson's first broadcast as host of The Tonight Show on October 1, 1962, photographs taken that night survive, including Carson being introduced by Groucho Marx, as does an audio recording of Marx's introduction and Carson's first monologue . One of his first jokes upon starting the show (after receiving a few words of encouragement from Marx, one of which was, "Don't go to Hollywood!") was to pretend to panic and say, "I want my nana!" (This recording was played at the start of Carson's final broadcast on May 22, 1992.)  The oldest surviving video recording of the show is dated November 1962, while the oldest surviving color recording is from April 1964, when Carson interviewed Jake Ehrlich Sr. as his guest.

The 30-minute audio recordings of many of the "missing" episodes are contained in the Library of Congress in the Armed Forces Radio collection. Many 1970s-era episodes have been licensed to distributors that advertise mail-order offers on late-night TV. The later shows that exist in full were stored by Carson in a bomb-proof underground salt mine outside Hutchinson, Kansas.

The non-tape archives pertaining to Carson's show are held by the Elkhorn Valley Museum in Carson's hometown of Norfolk, Nebraska. Beginning in 2020, the museum began working with the National Comedy Center to preserve the archive.

Rebroadcasts and streaming availability 
A large amount of material from Carson's first two decades of The Tonight Show (1962–1982), much of it not seen since it had first aired, appeared in a half hour "clip/compilation" syndicated program known as Carson's Comedy Classics that aired in 1983. Audio clips from the show were featured nightly on WHO-AM in Des Moines, Iowa in the mid-2000s. In 2014, Turner Classic Movies would begin rerunning select interviews from the program for a new series called "Carson on TCM" presented by Conan O'Brien, who himself hosted The Tonight Show briefly.

The digital multicast network Antenna TV acquired rerun rights to whole episodes of the series in August 2015. Unlike the previous clip shows, Antenna TV's airings feature full broadcasts as they were originally seen, with the only edits being removal of The Tonight Show name, with the show being renamed simply as Johnny Carson (as of January 2018, the broadcasts air opposite the current edition of The Tonight Show in much of the United States, and NBC still owns the trademark on that name), and with bumpers, walk-on music and the closing theme being replaced by generic music cues from the Warner/Chappell Production Music library. Most musical guest segments are also removed. Antenna TV began airing the show seven days a week beginning January 1, 2016. Currently, sixty-minute episodes (from September 1980-May 1992) air Monday through Friday nights, and ninety-minute episodes (from 1972-September 12, 1980) Saturday and Sunday nights.

Selected episodes of Carson's show are available on NBC's Peacock streaming service. Shout! Factory launched a 24/7 streaming channel devoted to the series in August 2020, which is distributed through free over-the-top platforms including Stirr, Xumo and Pluto TV.  Recently, The Roku Channel began streaming JohnnyCarsonTV on its multi-channel platform LiveTV.

Guest hosts 
Jack Paar had often asked Carson to guest-host Tonight in its earliest years and repeatedly claimed he had been responsible for NBC's selection of Carson in 1962 as his replacement. Steve Allen also utilized guest hosts, including Carson and Ernie Kovacs, particularly after he began hosting The Steve Allen Show in prime time in 1956 and needed to reduce his workload on Tonight. 

The Tonight Show Starring Johnny Carson had guest hosts for entire weeks during Carson's vacations and other nights he had off. Many guest hosts were already large names in their own right, among them Frank Sinatra, Burt Reynolds and Don Rickles. Comedian Woody Allen guest hosted three times between 1966 and 1971. The following is a list of those who guest-hosted at least fifty times during the first 21 years of the show's run:
Joey Bishop (177 times, mostly in the 1960s)
Joan Rivers (93, during the 1970s and 1980s)
John Davidson (87)
Bob Newhart (87)
David Brenner (70)
McLean Stevenson (58)
Jerry Lewis (52, mostly in the 1960s)
David Letterman (51, mostly between 1980 and 1981)

Sammy Davis Jr. guest hosted in April 1965, becoming the first African-American to host a talk show. Harry Belafonte guest hosted for a week in February 1968, and among Belafonte's guests were Robert F. Kennedy and Martin Luther King Jr., just months before both men were assassinated (King in April, Kennedy in June).
On April 2, 1979, Kermit the Frog was guest host.  In addition, many other Muppets appeared for skits and regular segments: Frank Oz voiced Fozzie Bear and Animal, while Jerry Nelson performed Uncle Deadly, a Vincent Price-inspired Muppet during a segment with the real Price. Richard Dawson guest hosted 14 times during 1979 and 1980, and was being considered as a full-time replacement should Carson have retired during his 1980 contract dispute with NBC.

Carson's contract, that took effect in 1981, reduced his work schedule to three nights a week, 37 weeks a year. "Best of Carson" reruns aired on Tuesdays in the weeks that Carson was hosting new shows. Monday night shows and shows for most of the 15 weeks that Carson had off were hosted by guest hosts. Due to the frequent need for substitutes, starting in 1983 permanent guest hosts were hired in order to give the program more stability. The permanent guest hosts were Joan Rivers (1983–1986), then, after about a year where a wide range of guest hosts were used, Garry Shandling alternating with Jay Leno (1987–1988) and finally Leno alone (1988–1992) after Shandling left to focus on his Showtime series It's Garry Shandling's Show.  Leno, who first guest hosted in 1986, would do so 333 times before becoming the next Tonight Show host in 1992. Though the concept of using "permanent" guest hosts was fairly strictly adhered to, occasionally illness or some other situation necessitated a substitute guest host, as when David Brenner filled in for Joan Rivers on October 31 and November 1, 1985, when Rivers's husband was briefly hospitalized.

During the show's run, its cast and crew collaborated with a number of NBC sitcoms to produce spoof episodes of the Tonight Show. These spoofs typically ran in the sitcom's usual spot on the  broadcast schedule and featured one of the sitcom's main characters as the guest host.

Joan Rivers 

In September 1983, Joan Rivers was designated Carson's permanent guest host, a role she had been essentially filling for the previous year. In 1986, after years as a guest and 190 total appearances as guest host, she left the program for her own show on the then-new Fox Network. According to Carson, Rivers never personally informed him of the existence of her show. Rivers, on the other hand, disagreed. Nevertheless, Rivers' new show was quickly canceled, and she never again appeared on The Tonight Show with Carson.  Nor did she appear on The Tonight Show with Jay Leno, a ban maintained by Leno out of respect for Carson. She also never appeared during Conan O'Brien's seven-month run. After Carson's death in 2005, Rivers told CNN that Carson never forgave her for leaving, and never spoke to her again, even after she wrote him a note following the accidental death of Carson's son Ricky in June 1991. On February 17, 2014, Rivers returned to the Tonight Show as part of a skit in which numerous celebrities paid new host, Jimmy Fallon, after having lost the bet that he would never become the host of the program. Rivers appeared for a full-length interview segment on March 27, 2014.

The program of July 26, 1984, with guest host Joan Rivers, was the first MTS stereo broadcast in U.S. television history, though not the first television broadcast with stereophonic sound. Only NBC's flagship local station in New York City, WNBC, had stereo broadcast capability at that time. NBC transmitted The Tonight Show in stereo sporadically through 1984 and on a regular basis beginning in 1985.

Consequential appearances
According to Skepticism activist James Randi, Carson invited Uri Geller, who claimed paranormal powers, onto the Tonight Show specifically to disprove the Israeli performer's claims. Randi later wrote, "that Johnny had been a magician himself", so prior to the date of taping, Randi was asked "to help prevent any trickery."  Per Randi's advice, the show prepared their own props without informing Geller, and did not let Geller or his staff "anywhere near them." When Geller joined Carson on stage, he appeared surprised that he was not going to be interviewed, but instead was expected to display his abilities using the provided articles. Geller said "This scares me." and "I'm surprised because before this program your producer came and he read me at least 40 questions you were going to ask me." Geller was unable to display any paranormal abilities, saying "I don't feel strong" and he expressed his displeasure at feeling like he was being "pressed" to perform by Carson. According to Adam Higginbotham's Nov. 7, 2014 article in the New York Times: 

However, this appearance on The Tonight Show, which Carson and Randi had orchestrated to debunk Geller's claimed abilities, backfired. According to Higginbotham,

Carson's last shows 
As his retirement approached, Carson tried to avoid sentimentality but would periodically show clips of some of his favorite moments and again invited some of his favorite guests.  He told his crew, "Everything comes to an end; nothing lasts forever. Thirty years is enough. It's time to get out while you're still working on top of your game, while you're still working well."

Carson hosted his penultimate show, featuring guests Robin Williams and Bette Midler, on May 21, 1992. The last of Carson's monologues was delivered on this episode and was written by Jim Mulholland, Steven Kunes and Rift Fournier. Once underway, the atmosphere was electric and Carson was greeted with a sustained, two-minute intense standing ovation. Williams was especially uninhibited with his trademark manic energy and stream-of-consciousness lunacy. Midler was more emotional. When the conversation turned to Johnny's favorite songs, "I'll Be Seeing You" and "Here's That Rainy Day," Midler mentioned that she knew a chorus of the latter. She began singing the song, and after the first line, Carson joined in and turned it into an impromptu duet. Midler finished her appearance from center stage, where she slowly sang the pop standard "One for My Baby (and One More for the Road)." Carson became unexpectedly tearful, and a shot of the two of them was captured by a camera angle from across the set that had never before been used on the show. The audience became tearful as well and called the three performers out for a second bow after the taping was completed.  This show was immediately recognized as a television classic that Midler considered one of the most emotional moments of her life and eventually won an Emmy for her role in it.

Carson had no guests on his final episode of The Tonight Show on May 22, 1992, which was instead a retrospective show taped before an invitation-only studio audience of family, friends, and crew. More than fifty million people tuned in for this finale, which ended with Carson sitting on a stool alone at center stage, similar to Jack Paar's last show. He said these final words in conclusion:

A few weeks after the final show aired, it was announced that NBC and Carson had struck a deal to develop a new series.  Ultimately, however, Carson chose not to return to television. He gave only two major interviews after his retirement: one to The Washington Post in 1993, and the other to Esquire magazine in 2002. Carson hinted in his 1993 interview that he did not think he could top what he had already accomplished. He rarely appeared elsewhere after retiring, providing only a guest voice on an episode of The Simpsons, which included him performing feats of strength and featured Bette Midler as well.  Carson's final television appearance was cameo on the May 13, 1994, Late Show with David Letterman where he handed over a copy of a Top 10 List and sat in Dave's chair for a minute.  He was prepared to say a few words, but the crowd's cheering was so loud and so sustained, that he humorously decided to leave without saying anything -- although as he exited, he could be heard saying "Thank you, good night!"  

In 2005, after Carson's death, it was revealed that he had made a habit of sending jokes to Dave Letterman via fax machine which Letterman would then sometimes incorporate into his monologues. The January 31, 2005, episode of the Late Show with David Letterman, which featured a tribute to Carson, began with a monologue by Letterman composed entirely of jokes written by Carson himself after his retirement.

In 2011, the last Carson Tonight show was ranked No. 10 on the TV Guide Network special, TV's Most Unforgettable Finales.

See also
There's... Johnny!

References

External links 

 
1960s American late-night television series
1960s American variety television series
1962 American television series debuts
1970s American late-night television series
1970s American variety television series
1980s American late-night television series
1980s American variety television series
1990s American late-night television series
1990s American variety television series
1992 American television series endings
American television shows featuring puppetry
NBC late-night programming
Burbank, California
English-language television shows
NBC original programming
Primetime Emmy Award for Outstanding Variety Series winners
Primetime Emmy Award-winning television series
Television series by Carson Productions
Television shows filmed in California
Television shows filmed in New York City